Carphoides setigera, the green carphoides, is a species of geometrid moth in the family Geometridae. It is found in North America.

The MONA or Hodges number for Carphoides setigera is 6623.

References

Further reading

 

Melanolophiini
Articles created by Qbugbot
Moths described in 1958